Abanar Rural District is a rural district (dehestan) in Kalat District, Abdanan County, Ilam Province, Iran. At the 2006 census, its population was 2,149, in 380 families.  The rural district has 8 villages.

References 

Rural Districts of Ilam Province
Abdanan County